Dogzilla  were a British electronic music duo. The group had four major releases between 2003 and 2008, and was composed of Simon Patterson and Richie Kayvan, both based in London. They are most famous for their single "Without You" which charted in numerous countries, including Finland where it reached the number 11 spot. The song also appeared on many respected compilation albums such as Dave Pearce Dance Anthem Classics and former world #1 DJ Paul Van Dyk picked it as his track of the year. Their eponymously titled debut was featured in the 2004 film, 'The Football Factory'.

In 2008, Simon Patterson left the project, essentially leading to their dissolution. He has since become a successful trance artist in his own right.

Kayvan is now a music writer, producer and mix engineer, having worked with artists such as Ellie Goulding, Mark Morrison and Jamie Cullum. His mix of Judas Priest's ‘Dissident Aggressor’ won the band a Grammy Award in 2010.

Discography

Singles
 2003 - Dogzilla
 2004 - Your Eyes
 2005 - Without You
 2007 - Frozen

Remixes
 2003 - Solex (Close To The Edge)
 2003 - In The Park
 2003 - So Damn Beautiful
 2004 - Amen (Don't Be Afraid)
 2004 - It's All Vain
 2004 - Come (Into My Dream)
 2004 - When The Dawn Breaks
 2005 - Dark Side Of The Moon
 2006 - The Ones We Loved
 2006 - Stimulate

References

British electronic music groups
British dance music groups
British trance music groups